Lieutenant-Colonel Sir John Augustus Hope, 16th Baronet, OBE (7 July 1869 - 17 April 1924) was a British soldier and politician.

Life
Hope was son of Rev. Canon Charles Augustus Hope, Rector of Barwick in Elmet, Yorkshire and the grandson of Sir John Hope, 11th Baronet. He entered the British Army when he was commissioned a second lieutenant in the King's Royal Rifle Corps (KRRC) on 22 May 1889, and was promoted to the rank of lieutenant on 1 July 1891 and to captain on 22 August 1897. Major in 1905. He served in the Second Boer War in South Africa in 1901-1902 and was awarded the Queen's medal with 4 clasps. He was back as a regular officer in the 3rd battalion of his regiment in early September 1902, and was promoted to major in 1905. He later served in World War I with the 9th Battalion King's Royal Rifle Corps, was wounded and awarded the OBE in 1919.

He succeeded his uncle, Sir Alexander Hope, 15th Baronet (1824–1918), on 7 March 1918 as the 16th Baronet Hope of Craighall.

Hope was an unsuccessful Unionist candidate for Midlothian at the December 1910 General Election, but was elected for the seat at a by-election in 1912. In 1918 when the constituency was split, he was elected as Conservative member for Midlothian North and Peebles, which he held until 1922.

Family
In 1910 Hope married the Hon. Mary Bruce, OBE, eldest daughter of Alexander Bruce, 6th Lord Balfour of Burleigh. The couple had the following children:

Sir Archibald Philip Hope (1912–1987), 17th Baronet Hope of Craighall, commanded No. 601 Squadron RAF during the Battle of Britain
Lt.-Col. John Cecil Hope, DSO MC, (1913-1945), 1st Battalion, King's Royal Rifle Corps died on 24 April 1945 on active duty in Italy
Lt.-Col. Hugh Alexander Hope, OBE MC, (1914-1982), fought in WWII with the King's Royal Rifle Corps
 Katharine Anne Hope (1916-1987), married Carl Raymond Davis

References

External links 

Sir John's Find A Grave Memorial

1869 births
1924 deaths
John
Baronets in the Baronetage of Nova Scotia
King's Royal Rifle Corps officers
British Army personnel of the Second Boer War
British Army personnel of World War I
Unionist Party (Scotland) MPs
Members of the Parliament of the United Kingdom for Scottish constituencies
UK MPs 1910–1918
UK MPs 1918–1922
Officers of the Order of the British Empire